Ivo Valenta (born 3 August 1956) is a Czech businessman and politician. Valenta owns betting firm SYNOT and served as Senator from Uherské Hradiště.

References 

1956 births
Independent politicians in the Czech Republic
Living people
Civic Democratic Party (Czech Republic) Senators
Czech businesspeople
Czech billionaires
People from Frýdek-Místek District